Ronald Egbert Ward (7 May 1905 – 8 November 2000) was an Australian cricketer. He played five first-class matches for Tasmania between 1930 and 1936.

Ward was born at Adelaide in 1905. He died at Launceston, Tasmania in 2000 aged 95. Ward was a flight lieutenant for the Royal Australian Air Force during World War II, and was awarded a Bronze Star Medal.

References

External links
 

1905 births
2000 deaths
Australian cricketers
Tasmania cricketers
Cricketers from Adelaide
Royal Australian Air Force personnel of World War II
Royal Australian Air Force officers
Foreign recipients of United States military awards and decorations